Roger G. McMurrin (born 1939) is an American conductor and pastor who moved to Ukraine and founded a symphony orchestra there to perform sacred music.

Early life 
McMurrin was born in Bedford, Indiana. As a youth, he moved to Xenia, Ohio. He earned a degree in music from Olivet Nazarene University and became a teacher at Xenia High School. He then earned a master's degree from Ohio State University. He later became a music instructor in a college where he also studied conducting techniques.

Musical career

United States 
McMurrin started working in music in 1972 at Coral Ridge Presbyterian Church in Fort Lauderdale, Florida. He later became the director of music at the church. After 16 years at Coral Ridge, McMurrin left to become director of music at Highland Park Presbyterian Church in Dallas, Texas and then moved on to First Presbyterian Church in Orlando, Florida.

McMurrin has also performed on Diane Bish's The Joy of Music, including as part of the Coral Ridge choir during an episode about the life of John Wesley.

Ukraine
In 1991, McMurrin was invited to Kiev, Ukraine by Episcopal priest, George McCammon to conduct local musicians in a performance of Georg Friedrich Händel's Messiah. McMurrin had initially planned to go to the Caribbean and was only aware of Kiev from The Great Gate of Kiev from Pictures at an Exhibition. Upon arrival in 1992, McMurrin became aware that the Ukrainians had not heard Handel's Messiah before as it had been banned by the Soviet Union. McMurrin conducted the musicians in performing two concerts in Ukraine, where Messiah was performed for the first time in 70 years in Ukraine. During the plane ride back to the United States, McMurrin felt that God wanted him to move to Ukraine. McMurrin moved to Ukraine permanently in 1993 where he taught English and musical theory at St. Andrew's Preparatory School. In December McMurrin had to return to the United States as he only had $16 left. Friends gave McMurrin money for him to return to Ukraine and set up the Kyiv Symphony Orchestra and Chorus, the first private orchestra in Ukraine. The orchestra later went on tours of Ukraine and the United States.

In 1994, McMurrin established the Church of the Holy Trinity as a place for the orchestra to play, becoming an ordained pastor in the process. At the time, most of the orchestra members were atheists or agnostics; however, a group of them became Christians after performing Christian music with McMurrin. McMurrin became the pastor of the church, which was assisted in funding as a result of the Orange Revolution.

Personal life 
McMurrin is the son of the Reverend Albert McMurrin. McMurrin is a Christian and an ordained minister in the Presbyterian Church. McMurrin is married and has two sons.

References 

Living people
People from Xenia, Ohio
Olivet Nazarene University alumni
Ohio State University alumni
American male conductors (music)
American expatriates in Ukraine
1939 births
American Presbyterian ministers
American Presbyterian missionaries
Schoolteachers from  Ohio
Classical musicians from Ohio
21st-century American conductors (music)
21st-century American male musicians